Dacre is a civil parish in the Eden District, Cumbria, England. It contains 68 listed buildings that are recorded in the National Heritage List for England. Of these, three are listed at Grade I, the highest of the three grades, five are at Grade II*, the middle grade, and the others are at Grade II, the lowest grade.  The parish contains the villages of Dacre, Stainton, Great Blencow, and Newbiggin and the surrounding countryside.  Unusual listed features in the parish include three folly farmhouses built to resemble forts for the 11th Duke of Norfolk, and four statues of bears in the churchyard of St Andrew's Church.  Most of the other listed buildings are houses and associated structures, farmhouses and farm buildings.  Other listed structures include a church and items in the churchyard, bridges, a public house, a monument, a boundary stone, a block of limekilns, and a telephone kiosk.


Key

Buildings

Notes and references

Notes

Citations

Sources

Lists of listed buildings in Cumbria
Listed buildings